Aliabad-e Qarchi (also Romanized as ‘Alīābād-e Qarchī; also known as ‘Alīābād-e Qarcheh) is a village in Qarah Chaman Rural District, Arzhan District, Shiraz County, Fars Province, Iran. At the 2006 census, its population was 101, in 28 families.

References 

Populated places in Shiraz County